King Philip Regional High School (KPRHS) is a regional high school in Wrentham, Massachusetts, United States. It is a part of the King Philip Regional School District, drawing students from three towns: Wrentham, Norfolk, and Plainville.

Marching band 
The King Philip Regional High School Marching Band, known as "The Pride and The Passion", has traveled throughout New England and the United States for state, regional, and national competitions including Massachusetts Instrumental and Choral Conductors Association (MICCA) marching band festivals, New England Scholastic Band Association competitions, USBands national competitions, and Bands of America Grand National competitions.

Awards and titles won by the King Philip Marching Band include:

 33 consecutive MICCA Finals Gold Medal awards (1986—2019)
 USBands Group 2 Open Class National Champions (1995)
 USBands Group 3 Open Class National Champions (1998, 1999, 2013, 2015, 2016)
 USBands Group 4 Open Class National Champions (2009, 2012)

Notable alumni and faculty
Lofa Tatupu (2001), NFL linebacker
David G. Binney (1958), appointed to the U.S. Military Academy by Then-Senator John F. Kennedy, served as deputy director of the FBI
Jeff Plympton, Former Red Sox Pitcher
Jake Layman, NBA player (Minnesota Timberwolves)
Joe Johnson, Former MLB Pitcher.
Jeremy Udden, musician.
Liam Kyle Sullivan, YouTuber
Michelle Carter, American woman convicted of manslaughter in the death of Conrad Henri Roy III.
Emory Rounds - Wikipedia, Director of Ethics United States of America. Bush, Trump, Biden Administrations.

References

External links
 
 

Public high schools in Massachusetts
Schools in Norfolk County, Massachusetts
Hockomock League